The United States Basketball League (USBL) was a professional men's spring basketball league.

USBL may also refer to:

 United States Baseball League, a defunct baseball league that operated in 1912
 Ultra-short baseline, a type of acoustic positioning.

See also 

Uzbl